Wood Lake is a lake in Coon Creek Township, Lyon County, Minnesota.

References

External links
 Wood Lake, Minnesota Department of Natural Resources.  Aerial photograph, map, fishing information, recreation, high and low water marks, water quality, and other information.

Lakes of Lyon County, Minnesota
Lakes of Minnesota